David Clayton-Thomas (born David Henry Thomsett, 13 September 1941) is a Grammy Award-winning Canadian musician, singer, and songwriter, best known as the lead vocalist of the American band Blood, Sweat & Tears. Clayton-Thomas has been inducted into the Canadian Music Hall of Fame and in 2007 his jazz/rock composition "Spinning Wheel" was enshrined in the Canadian Songwriter's Hall of Fame. In 2010, Clayton-Thomas received his star on Canada's Walk of Fame.

Clayton-Thomas began his music career in the early 1960s, working the clubs on Toronto's Yonge Street, where he discovered his love of singing and playing the blues. Before moving to New York City in 1967, Clayton-Thomas fronted a couple of local bands, first The Shays and then The Bossmen, one of the earliest rock bands with significant jazz influences. But the real success came only a few difficult years later when he joined Blood, Sweat & Tears.

Early life
Clayton-Thomas was born in Kingston upon Thames, Surrey, England, the son of Fred Thomsett, a decorated Canadian soldier of World War II. Clayton-Thomas's mother, Freda May (née Smith), played the piano and met Thomsett when she came to entertain the troops at a London hospital. After the war, the family settled in Willowdale, Toronto. From the beginning, Clayton-Thomas and his father had a troubled relationship. By the time Clayton-Thomas was fourteen, he had left home and was sleeping in parked cars and abandoned buildings and stealing food and clothing to survive. He was arrested several times for vagrancy, petty theft, and street brawls and spent his teen years bouncing in and out of various jails and reformatories, including the Burwash Industrial Farm.

Early career
He inherited a love for music from his mother, and when an old guitar came into his possession, left behind by an outgoing inmate, he began to teach himself to play. Upon his release from detention in 1962, he gravitated to the Yonge Street "strip" in Toronto. Rhythm & blues migrating up from Detroit and Chicago was the music of choice on the strip, and Arkansas rockabilly pioneer Ronnie Hawkins recognized the formidable talent of the young 'Sonny' Thomas and took him under his wing. It wasn't long before he was fronting his own bands. The first was called David Clayton Thomas and The Fabulous Shays. By this time, he had changed his surname to put some distance between his new life and his troubled teenage years.

In 1964 Clayton-Thomas and The Shays recorded a rendition of John Lee Hooker's "Boom Boom". This led to a New York engagement for the Shays on NBC-TV's Hullabaloo at the invitation of its host, fellow Canadian Paul Anka. Abandoning the bars on the strip, Clayton-Thomas began performing in Yorkville Village's coffeehouses. He immersed himself in the local jazz & blues scene dominated by the likes of John Lee Hooker, Joe Williams, Sonny Terry and Brownie McGhee, Lenny Breau, Oscar Peterson, and Moe Koffman.  The album David Clayton Thomas and the Shays à Go-Go was recorded for Roman Records in 1965, and was followed by David Clayton Thomas Sings Like It Is! for the same label in 1966. Clayton-Thomas made his mark more forcibly with his next band, The Bossmen, one of the first rock bands anywhere to include jazz musicians. In 1966 he wrote and performed the R&B-driven anti-war song "Brainwashed", which became a major Canadian hit, peaking at No. 11 on the national RPM chart.

One night in 1966 after "sitting in" with blues singer John Lee Hooker in Yorkville, Clayton-Thomas left with him for New York. They played a Greenwich Village club for a couple of weeks; Hooker then left for Europe and Clayton-Thomas stayed on in New York City. He survived by playing "basket houses", where performers were given a few minutes of stage time and then passed the basket.

Blood Sweat & Tears peak years
Folk singer Judy Collins heard Clayton-Thomas one night at a club uptown and told her friend, drummer Bobby Colomby, about him. Bobby's band, Blood Sweat & Tears, had broken up four months after releasing its debut Columbia album, Child Is Father to the Man. Colomby was impressed with Clayton-Thomas's vocal talent and he invited him to join the band. They took the reformed group into the Cafe Au Go-Go in the Village.

In his 1974 autobiography, Clive: Inside the Record Business, Clive Davis, then president of Columbia Records, described his initial impression of Clayton-Thomas singing at the Café Au Go-Go:
He was staggering... a powerfully built singer who exuded an enormous earthy confidence. He jumped right out at you. I went with a small group of people, and we were electrified. He seemed so genuine, so in command of the lyric... a perfect combination of fire and emotion to go with the band’s somewhat cerebral appeal. I knew he would be a strong, strong figure.

Clayton-Thomas's first album with the band, Blood, Sweat & Tears (which was released in December 1968) – despite its eponymous title, it was actually the band's second album – sold ten million copies worldwide. The record topped the Billboard album chart for seven weeks and charted for 109 weeks. It won five Grammy Awards, including Album of the Year and Best Performance by a Male Vocalist. It featured three hit singles, "You've Made Me So Very Happy", "Spinning Wheel", and "And When I Die" (on the Hot 100, each peaked at No. 2 and lasted 13 weeks) as well as a rendition of Billie Holiday's "God Bless The Child". (Seeking to capitalize on the newfound fame of the singer, in 1969 Decca Records purchased the master tapes of the blues-oriented Roman Records material, dubbed in horns to make it sound more like Blood, Sweat & Tears, and released the album David Clayton-Thomas!)

With Clayton-Thomas fronting the band, Blood, Sweat & Tears continued with a string of hit albums, including Blood, Sweat & Tears 3 which featured Carole King's "Hi-De-Ho" and Clayton-Thomas's "Lucretia MacEvil", and Blood, Sweat & Tears 4, which yielded another Clayton-Thomas-penned hit single, "Go Down Gamblin'" and "Lisa Listen to Me". Blood Sweat & Tears' Greatest Hits album has to date reportedly chalked up over seven million copies in worldwide sales.

Blood, Sweat & Tears headlined at major venues around the world: the Royal Albert Hall, the Metropolitan Opera House, the Hollywood Bowl, Madison Square Garden, and Caesar's Palace, as well as the Newport Jazz Festival and Woodstock. It was the first contemporary band to break through the Iron Curtain with its historic United States Department of State-sponsored tour of Eastern Europe in May and June 1970). In the early years Clayton-Thomas lived on the road, travelling all over Europe, Australia, Asia, South America, the US, and Canada with Blood, Sweat & Tears. 

The constant touring began to take its toll. Clayton-Thomas left the band in 1972, exhausted by life on the road. By the mid '70s, the founding members began to drift away to start families and pursue their own musical ambitions.

Subsequent career
In 1972 Thomas released his first Columbia solo album after Blood, Sweat & Tears, simply titled David Clayton Thomas. In 1973 the second solo album Tequila Sunrise was issued by Columbia. In 1974 he issued the Harmony Junction album on RCA. In 1975 Thomas returned to front Blood Sweat & Tears again on the Columbia albums New City and, in 1976, More Than Ever. In 1977 they released Brand New Day on the ABC label. In 1978 Thomas issued another solo album on ABC, titled simply Clayton. In 1980 Blood, Sweat & Tears issued the MCA album Nuclear Blues, which also included Thomas. Later in the decade Columbia issued the double live Blood, Sweat & Tears album Live And Improvised again with Thomas.  In 2004, Clayton-Thomas left New York for Toronto and launched an All-Star 10-piece band. Since then, he has toured and recorded almost a dozen albums under his own name.

Discography

Albums

Singles
'Boom Boom' No. 16 July 1964 CHUM
'Walk That Walk' No. 3 April 1965 CAN/No. 28 CHUM
'Take Me Back' No. 39 July 1965 CHUM
'Out of the Sunshine' No. 31 CAN/No. 32 September 1965 CHUM
'Brainwashed' No. 11 July 1966 CAN/No. 6 CHUM
'Anytime...Babe' No. 91 July 1974 CAN

See also

The David Clayton-Thomas Show
Canadian rock
Music of Canada

Sources
Clayton-Thomas, David (June 2010). Blood, Sweat and Tears. Penguin Canada. 
 Davis, Clive (December 1975). Clive: Inside the Record Business. Ballantine Books. 
 LeBlanc, Larry: David Clayton-Thomas (artist biography) <http://davidclaytonthomas.com/>
  (with CD of unissued music)

References

External links
 – official site

David Clayton-Thomas at CanadianBands.com
 David Clayton-Thomas at thecanadianencyclopedia.ca
 
Blood, Sweat & Tears band members

1941 births
Living people
Canadian guitarists
Canadian male singers
Canadian Music Hall of Fame inductees
Canadian people of English descent
Canadian rock singers
English male guitarists
English male singers
English people of Canadian descent
English rock singers
Juno Award winners
Musicians from London
Musicians from Toronto
People from Kingston upon Thames
People from Willowdale, Toronto
Blood, Sweat & Tears members
Jon and Lee & the Checkmates members